The 6th (Poona) Division was a division of the British Indian Army. It was formed in 1903, following the Kitchener reforms of the Indian Army.

World War I
The 6th (Poona) Division served in the Mesopotamian campaign. Led by Major General Barrett then Major General Townshend, the division were the first British Indian troops to land in Mesopotamia in November 1914 at the Fao Landing. After a string of early successes, the 6th Division was delivered a setback at the Battle of Ctesiphon in November 1915. Following this engagement, the division withdrew back to Kut, where Townshend made the decision to hold the city.  After a lengthy siege by the Ottomans, Townshend surrendered on April 29, 1916. 10,061 troops and 3,248 followers were taken captive. Following the surrender, the garrisoned force conducted a forced march back to Anatolia. The suffering of the enlisted soldiers was particularly egregious, and over 4,000 died in captivity.

After the surrender, the Poona Division ceased to exist until another 6th Division was raised in 1920 for the Iraq Rebellion.

Order of Battle December 1914
16th (Poona) Brigade
 2nd Bn. Dorsetshire Regiment
 1st Bn. 20th Duke of Cambridge's Own Infantry (Brownlow's Punjabis)
 1st Bn. 104th Wellesley's Rifles
 1st Bn. 117th Mahrattas
17th (Ahmednagar) Brigade
 1st Bn. Ox & Bucks
 1st Bn. 119th Infantry (The Mooltan Regiment)
 1st Bn. 103rd Mahratta Light Infantry
 1st Bn. 22nd Punjabis
18th (Belgaum) Brigade
 2nd Bn. Norfolk Regiment
 1st Bn. 110th Mahratta Light Infantry
 1st Bn. 120th Rajputana Infantry
 1st Bn. 7th (Duke of Connaught's Own) Rajputs
Divisional Artillery
 X Brigade, Royal Field Artillery (RFA) 
 76 Bty. RFA
 82 Bty. RFA
 63 Bty. RFA
 1st Indian Mountain Artillery Brigade
 23rd (Peshawar) Mountain Battery (Frontier Force)
 30th Mountain Battery
 1/5th Hampshire Howitzer Battery, RFA (Territorial Force)
Divisional troops
 33rd Queen Victoria's Own Light Cavalry
 17 Co. 3rd Sappers and Miners
 22 Co. 3rd Sappers and Miners
48th Pioneers

Divisional Commanders
This list is incomplete.

1908-1912: Major-General Edwin Alderson CB
1912-1915: Major-General Sir Arthur Barrett KCB KCVO
1915-1916: Major-General Charles Townshend CB DSO

See also

 List of Indian divisions in World War I

References

Bibliography

External links

Indian World War I divisions
Military units and formations established in 1903
British Indian Army divisions